Professor Jessica Meeuwig is the inaugural director of the Centre for Marine Futures at the University of Western Australia (UWA). In 2012 she was appointed as a Conservation Fellow of the Zoological Society of London and was also named as one of the 100 most influential people in Western Australia by The West Australian newspaper.

Career
After being awarded a PhD with Distinction by McGill University, Meeuwig became deputy  director of the conservation organisation Project Seahorse.  She worked in south east Asia on the science and management of reef fisheries, including the application of novel statistical approaches to understanding catch and effort data. On moving to Perth, Meeuwig worked for the WA Department of Environment and Conservation and the Australian Department of the Environment, Water, Heritage and the Arts in policy and planning positions. At UWA, she worked on the "Marine Futures" project prior to being appointed as inaugural director of the new Centre for Marine Futures.

Research
Meeuwig's PhD research was on the subject of statistical modelling of aquatic ecosystems. She now focuses on how marine fish communities are affected for good or ill by human activities, such as resource extraction or protection. Her research projects include investigating the displacement of humpback whales as a result of coastal development, researching how sharks and fish use underwater banks and canyons, and how marine sanctuaries generate ecological and economic benefits.

Environmental campaigns
Meeuwig is well known in Western Australia for her campaigning to protect the marine environment. She is a strong advocate for the creation of marine parks in Western Australia, an idea opposed by the WA state government.

Opposition to Western Australian shark cull
In response to the deaths of 7 swimmers attacked by sharks between 2010 and 2013, the government of Western Australia implemented a shark culling scheme in 2014 – a policy which generated considerable controversy in WA. Meeuwig made a submission opposing the scheme to the State Environmental Protection Agency, backed by 300 of the world's leading marine scientists. She has analysed the data from a similar scheme in Queensland and found no statistical evidence that it has proved effective in reducing deaths from shark attacks.

Awards and recognition
2009 WA Coastal Award for Excellence in Marine Science and Education (team award)
Conservation Fellow of the Zoological Society of London (appointed 2012)
2012 Finalist, WA Science Ambassador of the Year

Select publications and bibliography

Bushmeat and food security in the Congo Basin: linkages between wildlife and people's future. JE Fa, D Currie, J Meeuwig. Environmental Conservation 30 (01), 71-78
Biology of a seahorse species, Hippocampus comes in the central Philippines. NC Perante, MG Pajaro, JJ Meeuwig, ACJ Vincent. Journal of Fish Biology 60 (4), 821-837

References

Year of birth missing (living people)
Living people
Fellows of the Zoological Society of London
McGill University alumni
Academic staff of the University of Western Australia
Australian oceanographers